The 4 arrondissements of the Réunion department are:
 Arrondissement of Saint-Benoît, (subprefecture: Saint-Benoît) with 6 communes.  The population of the arrondissement was 126,777 in 2016.
 Arrondissement of Saint-Denis, (prefecture of the Réunion department: Saint-Denis) with 3 communes.  The population of the arrondissement was 204,304 in 2016.
 Arrondissement of Saint-Paul, (subprefecture: Saint-Paul) with 5 communes.  The population of the arrondissement was 214,073 in 2016.
 Arrondissement of Saint-Pierre, (subprefecture: Saint-Pierre) with 10 communes.  The population of the arrondissement was 307,770 in 2016.

History

At the creation of the department of Réunion in 1947, its only arrondissement was Saint-Denis. The arrondissement of Saint-Pierre, containing 11 communes that were previously part of the arrondissement of Saint-Denis, was created in 1964. The arrondissement of Saint-Benoît, containing six communes that were previously part of the arrondissement of Saint-Denis, was created in 1968. The arrondissement of Saint-Paul, containing four communes that were previously part of the arrondissement of Saint-Pierre and one commune that was previously part of the arrondissement of Saint-Denis, was created in 1969.

The borders of the arrondissements of Réunion were modified in September 2006:
 the communes Le Port and La Possession were transferred from the arrondissement of Saint-Denis to the arrondissement of Saint-Paul
 the communes Les Avirons and L'Étang-Salé were transferred from the arrondissement of Saint-Paul to the arrondissement of Saint-Pierre

See also
Cantons of the Réunion department
Communes of the Réunion department

References

Reunion
 
Reunion 1